Mentir para vivir (Life of Lies; dubbed as Lie So You Can Live by Univision) is a Mexican telenovela produced by Rosy Ocampo for Televisa. The telenovela is written by Maria Zarattini, who last wrote La Fuerza del Destino.

Episodes

References

Lists of Mexican television series episodes